M. arvensis may refer to:
 Mentha arvensis, the field mint, the wild mint or the corn mint, a plant species with a circumboreal distribution
 Myosotis arvensis, the field forget-me-not, a herbaceous annual plant species

See also
 Arvensis (disambiguation)